Steven Lewis (born November 14, 2006), known professionally as tana (formerly known as BabySantana), is an American rapper and singer. He rose to popularity within the early months of 2021 with his hit singles "14" (with Ka$hdami) and "Antisocial" (featuring Slump6s) which gained traction throughout TikTok and SoundCloud. He then later signed to his first major label Galactic — a subsidiary of Republic Records within the late months of 2021.

Early life 
Steven Lewis was born on November 14, 2006, in Columbus, Georgia, and was raised by his single mother, due to separation. Growing up in Columbus, he found work at a bread factory to save up money to buy equipment to make songs – along with financial help from his supportive mother. He would record his songs in a small closet in his house – solely engineering, mixing and mastering all his work on Audacity, later upgrading to FL Studio.

Tana grew up being heavily inspired by the Chicago rap scene, which at the time was led by Chief Keef and the late Fredo Santana — who also inspired his former rap alias BabySantana, alongside BabyTron.

Career

2018: Beginnings
tana started his music career in 2018, sharing music through platforms such as YouTube and SoundCloud by May of that year. Shortly after, tana kept practicing on his sound and also started to learn how to produce music. He later formed a small collective with his friends titled 1500  — which at first only included Slump6s, although additional artists and producers were recruited throughout upcoming years. This collective would ultimately be disbanded in 2022.

2020–21: Breakthrough
He then came to fame in 2020, subsequent to his single "Prada" after it went viral on social media platforms; which would lead to a remix with label associate, Lil Tecca. He later released three projects that year; those being Recreation, Quan and Planet Sosa – however, all three projects would be deleted from all platforms at later dates.

tana's career would later peak in 2021, after his Slump6s-assisted single "Antisocial" would go viral; which also led to an official sequel featuring SSGKobe, Xhulooo and Yung Fazo.

Alongside Lil Tecca, tana is associated with artists including KA$HDAMI, midwxst, yvngxchris among others. He is currently signed to Galactic Records — a subsidiary of Republic Records, although tana still continues to release music independently through his SoundCloud. tana and fellow rapper KA$HDAMI featured on the Lyrical Lemonade YouTube channel with their hit collaboration "14" on July 20, 2021.

2022–present: Gaultier 
In 2022, tana announced his debut studio album, Gaultier, which was initally set for a late 2022 release. On August 15, 2022, tana released the first promotional single "Swaggin Like This" with Lancey Foux — following it up with his anticipated single "Hell Yeah" four days later. On January 27, 2023, tana released Gaultier.

Discography

Mixtapes
 Planet Sosa (2020)
 DAKOTAROMANI (with Slump6s) (2021)
 GAULTIER (2023)

Singles
 "Red Eye!" (2020)
 "Fenoly" (2020)
 "Prada" (2020)
 "2020" (2020)
 "Blitz" (2020)
 "No Hook" (2021)
 "Antisocial" (2021)
 "Patricia" (2021)
 "14" (2021)
 "Off The Leash!" (2022)
 "nyc" (2022)
 "Kite" (2022)
 "swaggin like this" (2022)
 "hell yeah" (2022)
 "Red" (2022)
 "fear no man" (2022)

References 

Songwriters from Georgia (U.S. state)
Living people
American male rappers
2006 births
Rappers from Georgia (U.S. state)